Kidwell may refer to:
Persons
Catherine Kidwell (1921–2002), American novelist and teacher
Clara Sue Kidwell (born 1941), Native American historian, feminist and author 
David Kidwell (b. 1977), New Zealand professional rugby league player
Peggy A. Kidwell, American historian of science and museum curator
Wayne L. Kidwell (b. 1938), American jurist and politician; state attorney general and state senator
Zedekiah Kidwell (1814–1872), American physician, lawyer, and politician from West Virginia; U.S. representative 1853–57

Other
Kidwell Airport, Clark County, Nevada, USA
Kidwell, West Virginia

See also
 Justice Kidwell (disambiguation)